is a Japanese footwear company, with stores in Japan, South Korea, and Taiwan.

History
The company was founded by Masahiro Miki in Shinjuku in 1985 as Boeki Shoji Inc. In 1987, the company moved to Arakawa and changed its name to International Trading Corporation (ITC). It was in 1990 that ABC-Mart was established, with three stores opening in Tokyo. A year later, ABC-Mart acquired the exclusive sales rights of Vans products in Japan. The company was then re-established as a joint stock company in 1997 before moving its headquarters to Shibuya a year later.

In 2002, ITC absorbed ABC-Mart and was renamed ABC-Mart, Inc. before being publicly listed on the Tokyo Stock Exchange. The company then opened its first branch in South Korea in 2003 and in Taiwan in 2009.

In 2012, ABC-Mart bought the American company LaCrosse Footwear, which in turn purchased the U.S. boot maker Whites Boots in 2014.

In 2019, ABC-Mart set a milestone by opening its 1,000th store.

References

External links

Japanese brands
Japanese companies established in 1985
Athletic shoe brands
Clothing retailers of Japan
Companies listed on the Tokyo Stock Exchange
Footwear retailers
Retail companies based in Tokyo
Retail companies established in 1985
Shoe brands
Shoe companies of Japan